Milena Dravić (5 October 1940 – 14 October 2018) was a Yugoslav and Serbian film, television and theatre actress.

Biography
Born in Belgrade, Dravić became involved with performing arts at the age of four via her parents enrolling her in a dance program. She would later switch to classical ballet.

In 1959, still a high school student, Dravić got spotted by director František Čáp who approached the eighteen-year-old about being in his film Vrata ostaju otvorena after seeing her on the cover of a youth magazine in a ballet dancers' group photo. After appearing in a few more films, she decided to pursue acting full-time and to that end successfully enrolled at the Academy of Theatre Arts (APU) within the Arts Academy in Belgrade.

Her big break came in 1962 in Branko Bauer's Prekobrojna for which she won the Golden Arena for Best Actress (Yugoslav equivalent of an Academy Award). The memorable role, as well as the much-publicized accolade, propelled her to becoming Yugoslavia's first and arguably biggest female movie star. She was a recipient of five Silver arenas (for supporting actress roles) and 2 Golden arenas (for leading actress roles).

Milena Dravić's career was long, prolific, and versatile. She was memorable and believable, whether as the tragic heroine in state-sponsored World War II epics, the eccentric protagonist of experimental arthouse films like WR: Mysteries of the Organism or in romantic comedies. She especially excelled in the latter during the 1970s and 1980s. She won the Cannes Best Supporting Actress Award in 1980 for Special Treatment.

For her roles and contributions to domestic cinematography, she received the prestigious Pavle Vujisić Award in August 1994.

On 15 December 2017 she was honored with the prestigious Dobričin prsten lifetime achievement award in Belgrade.

Personal life

Milena Dravić was married three times. Her third husband was the prominent Serbian actor Dragan Nikolić, with whom she had co-hosted the popular 1970s television program Obraz uz obraz.

Death
She died on 14 October 2018, after a long battle with illness.

Selected filmography

Vrata ostaju otvorena (1959) – Marija ... Petrova sestra
Dilizansa snova (1960) – Evica
Zajednicki stan (1960) – Ljubica
Bolje je umeti (1960) – Jola
The First Fires (1961) – Hajra
Leto je krivo za sve (1961) – Natalija
Kozara (1962) – Milja
Prekobrojna (1962) – Ranka
Pesceni grad (1962) – Milena
Radopolje (1963) – Mrvica
Destination Death (1964) – Seja
Sluzbeni polozaj (1964) – Zora
Lito vilovito (1964) – Mare
Narodni poslanik (1964) – Danica
Man is Not a Bird (1965) – Rajka
Devojka (1965) – Devojka
Klakson (1965) – Jana
Covik od svita (1965) – Visnja
The Camp Followers (1965) – Aspasia Anastasiou
Rondo (1966) – Neda
 (1966) – Momata
Looking Into the Eyes of the Sun (1966)
Sticenik (1966) – Herself
Zgodba ki je ni (1967) – Uciteljica
Nemirni (1967) – Zorica
The Morning (1967) – Aleksandra
Dim (1967) – Devojka
Hasanaginica (1967) – Hasanaginica
Sirota Marija (1968) – Marija
Sedmina (1969) – Filomena
Zaseda (1969) – Milica
Horoskop (1969) – Milka
Cross Country (1969) – Jovana
The Battle of Neretva (1969) – Nada
Biciklisti (1970) – Sara
Touha zvaná Anada (1971) – Zuzka
W.R.: Mysteries of the Organism (1971) – Milena
The Role of My Family in the Revolution (1971) – Devojka
 (1971) – Velika
Ko pride lev (1972) – Mihaela
The Battle of Sutjeska (1973) – Vera
Pjegava djevojka (1973) – Katy
 (1973) – Veronika Djakovic
Deps (1974) – Depsova djevojka Janja
A Performance of Hamlet in the Village of Mrdusa Donja (1974) – Andja / Ofelija
Strah (1974) – Karolina
Pavle Pavlovic (1975) – Adela
Povratak otpisanih (1976) – Lula Mitricevic
Group Portrait with a Lady (1977) – Schwester Klementine
Ljubavni zivot Budimira Trajkovica (1977) – Lepa Trajkovic
Tamo i natrag (1978) – Rada Jovanovic
Kvar (1978) – Sasina ljubavnica
Trener (1978) – Petrova bivsa zena
Povratak (1979) – Roza
Special Treatment (1980) – Kaca
Osam kila srece (1980)
Rad na odredjeno vreme (1980) – Svetlana
Snovi, zivot, smrt Filipa Filipovica (1980)
Sesta brzina (1981) – Gvozdenka
Laf u srcu (1981) – Savina zena
 (1982) – Sofija Arandjelovic
Moj tata na odredjeno vreme (1982) – Svetlana
Covek sa cetiri noge (1983) – Nada Jovanovic
Secerna vodica (1983) – Ana
Una (1984) – Miselova zena
Horvat’s Choice (1985) – Marijana Margitic
Nije lako sa muskarcima (1985) – Gordana Diklic
Anticasanova (1985) – Asja
Na istarski nacin (1985)
Osveta (1986) – Nada Pekar
Razvod na odredjeno vreme (1986) – Svetlana Milanovic
Lijepe zene prolaze kroz grad (1986) – Rahela
Dogodilo se na danasnji dan (1987) – Nastavnica
Cavka (1988) – Nastavnica
The Dark Side of the Sun (1988) – Mother
Spijun na stiklama (1988) – Livadinka Kukuric
Najbolji (1989) – Ninkova majka
Battle of Kosovo (1989) – Velislava
Cudna noc (1990)
Sekula se opet zeni (1991) – Sojka
Policajac sa Petlovog brda (1992) – Vera
Treca sreca (1995) – Prorocica Antilopa
Three Summer Days (1997) – Kaja
Cabaret Balkan (1998) – The Lady on the Bus with the Hat and Fox Stole
Sky Hook (2000) – Danka
Normalni ljudi (2001) – Tomina tetka
Boomerang (2001) – Gospodja Jeftic
Zona Zamfirova (2002) – Tasana
Ledina (2003) – Zorica
Sjaj u ocima (2003) – Vlasnica agencije
Lost and Found (2005) – Vera (segment "Fabulous Vera")
Agi i Ema (2007) – Ema
Crazy, Confused, Normal (2007–2015, TV Series) – Spomenka Vihorec
Love and Other Crimes (2008) – Majka
St. George Shoots the Dragon (2009) – Tetka Slavka
The village is burning, and the grandmother is combing her hair (2009, TV Series) – Direktorka banke

References

External links

 Complete filmography at the Complete Index to World Film
 

1940 births
2018 deaths
Burials at Belgrade New Cemetery
Actresses from Belgrade
Serbian film actresses
Cannes Film Festival Award for Best Actress winners
Golden Arena winners
Laureates of the Ring of Dobrica
Žanka Stokić award winners